The Technological Educational Institute (TEI) of Athens (TEI ATH; Greek: Ανώτατο Τεχνολογικό Εκπαιδευτικό Ίδρυμα Αθήνας) was a state higher-educational institute in Athens.

Founded in 1983, it originated from one of the first five Centres for Higher Technical Education initially established in 1974. The Technological Educational Institute of Athens offered a wide range of undergraduate and postgraduate studies.

On 1 March 2018 the institute was merged with TEI of Piraeus to create the newly established University of West Attica.

History
The institute was originally one of the first five KATE (Centers for Higher Technical Education, later reformed to KATEE) founded in Greece in 1974 to offer non-university technical and vocational programmes. In 1983, KATEE were dissolved and Technological Educational Institutes were established as self-governed, multi-disciplinary, technology-oriented state funded institutions and are equal to the Greek universities. The TEI of Athens was the largest of Greece's TEIs having 33 departments, 1,181 teaching staff and 16,288 students enrolled in 1986-87.

Academic profile

Campus 
Located in Aegaleo municipality, in the western part of Athens, the campus occupied an extended area, comprising the central administrative services and most of the facilities. This is currently the main campus of the University of West Attica.

Faculties and departments 
The TEI of Athens used to offer more than 35 undergraduate degrees ranging from Management and Economics to Applied Sciences and Engineering. The language of instruction and coursework was Greek, but some courses were also offered in English.

The departments were organized in five Faculties, Technological Applications, Health and Caring Professions, Fine Arts and Design, Food Technology and Nutrition and Management and Economics.

Academic evaluation 
In 2015, the external evaluation of the institution cited TEI of Athens as Worthy of merit.

An external evaluation of all academic departments in Greek universities was conducted by the Hellenic Quality Assurance and Accreditation Agency (HQA).

 Department of Informatics (2008) 
 Department of Librarianship and Information Systems (2011) 
 Department of Electronics (2010) 
 Department of Naval Architecture (2010) 
 Department of Energy Technology (2012) 
 Department of Dental Technology (2010) 
 Department of Nursing A' and B' (2011) 
 Department of Midwifery (2011) 
 Department of Physiotherapy (2012) 
 Department of Optics and Optometry (2011) 
 Department of Medical Radiology Technology (2011) 
 Department of Medical Laboratories (2012) 
 Department of Social Work (2013) 
 Department of Occupational Therapy (2014) 
 Department of Early Childhood Education (2014) 
 Department of Aesthetics and Cosmetology (2014) 
 Department of Food Technology (2011) 
 Department of Oenology and Beverage Technology (2011) 
 Department of Photography and Audiovisual Arts (2014) 
 Department of Interior Architecture, Decoration and Design (2014) 
 Department of Conservation of Antiquities and Works of Art (2011) 
 Career Office and Innovation Unit (DASTA)

See also 
 List of research institutes in Greece
 List of universities in Greece
 TEI of Thessaloniki
 TEI of Piraeus

References

External links
 TEI of Athens – Official Website 
 Hellenic Quality Assurance and Accreditation Agency (HQA) 
 Greek Research and Technology Network (GRNET) 
 Hellenic Academic Libraries Link (HEAL–Link) 
University of West Attika

Education in Athens
Athens